Luiz Inácio Lula da Silva and José Alencar were inaugurated as 35th President of Brazil and 23rd Vice President of Brazil, respectively, on 1 January 2003, in a ceremony held in the National Congress in Brasília, beginning the new Lula administration. In this occasion, it was the first time since redemocratization in 1985 that a president elect by the direct vote delivered the presidential sash to his successor also elected by the direct vote.

References

2003 in Brazil
2003 in politics
2002 elections in Brazil
Lula
Ceremonies in Brazil
Luiz Inácio Lula da Silva
January 2003 events in South America